Cambo may  refer to:

Cambo, Northumberland, a village in Northumberland, England
Cambo camera, Dutch camera manufacturer
Cambo Estate, historic house in Fife, Scotland
Cambo-les-Bains, town in  Pyrénées-Atlantiques, France
Cambo oil field, prospective oil field west of the Shetland Islands in Scotland

See also
Francesc Cambó (1876–1947), Spanish Catalan politician and translator